Luke Mitrani (born July 20, 1990 in New York City) is a former professional snowboarder and a musician.

He has 3 albums and has a love for live performances. Luke placed 1st in the halfpipe at the 2011 Winter Dew Tour with the highest score in Dew Tour history, 97.00. 
He has also placed 1st at many U.S Snowboarding Grand Prix competitions. 
Luke was the youngest person to ever make the US Snowboarding Team at the age of 12.

Early life
Luke was born in New York City on July 20, 1990. He was raised in Stratton, Vermont. Luke previously lived in Truckee, California with fellow snowboarder and friend, Danny Davis. Luke is a part of the Frends Crew made up of snowboarders Mason Aguirre, Kevin Pearce, Jack Mitrani, Keir Dillon, Danny Davis, Scotty Lago and Mikkel Bang.

Sponsors
Luke is sponsored by Volcom, Vestal Watches, Frends, Mammoth Mountain, Amp, Dragon, and the U.S. Snowboard Team.

Other Interests
Luke is an avid skateboarder, guitar player and music lover. Some of his favorite artists are The Grateful Dead, Neil Young, Jimi Hendrix, Santana and Led Zeppelin. Luke's music can be found on music streaming platforms such as Apple Music and Spotify.

References

External links
 Luke Mitrani's winning Dew Tour run
 The Frends' Crew Youtube Page
 Frends Crew Official Website

1990 births
Living people
American male snowboarders
Sportspeople from New York City